South Shields Corporation Tramways operated an electric tramway service in South Shields between 1906 and 1946.

History

South Shields Corporation Tramways took over the horse-drawn tramway network owned by the South Shields Tramways Company in 1906 and after a programme of modernisation and electrification, opened for service on 30 March 1906

The corporation obtained agreement with the neighbouring Jarrow and District Electric Tramway for through running, and accepted Jarrow tramcars on its own network. This arrangement lasted until the Jarrow Tramway closed in 1929.

Fleet

1-10 Hurst Nelson 1906
11-20 United Electric Car Company 1906
21-35 United Electric Car Company 1907
36-40 Brush Electrical Engineering Company 1913
41-45 English Electric 1921
29 Brush Electrical Engineering Company 1906 for the Jarrow and District Electric Tramway No 5 obtained second hand in 1929
48 Brush Electrical Engineering Company 1906 for the Jarrow and District Electric Tramway No 6 obtained second hand in 1929
46 G.F. Milnes & Co. 1902 for the Tyneside Tramways and Tramroads Company No 4 obtained second hand in 1930
47 G.F. Milnes & Co. 1902 for the Tyneside Tramways and Tramroads Company No 3 obtained second hand in 1930
23 Wigan Corporation Tramways obtained second hand in 1931
33 Wigan Corporation Tramways obtained second hand in 1931
50 Wigan Corporation Tramways obtained second hand in 1931
51 Wigan Corporation Tramways obtained second hand in 1931
16 English Electric 1920 for the Dumbarton Burgh and County Tramways No 31 then Ayr Corporation Tramways No 29 obtained second hand in 1931
34 English Electric 1920 for the Dumbarton Burgh and County Tramways No 32 then Ayr Corporation Tramways No 30 obtained second hand in 1931
18 Yorkshire (West Riding) Tramways obtained second hand in 1932
20 Yorkshire (West Riding) Tramways obtained second hand in 1932
52 Brush Electrical Engineering Company 1936

Closure

The service was closed on 31 March 1946 as the corporation moved to trolley bus operation.

References

Tram transport in England
Transport in South Shields